Space Buddies is a 2009 American science fiction comedy film. It is the third film in the Air Buddies franchise. It was released on February 3, 2009. Like Air Buddies and Snow Buddies, it was released directly on DVD and became the first one to be released on Blu-ray.

Plot
The film starts as Buddha and his owner, Sam, star-gazing. As a shooting star passes, Sam makes a wish that he can touch the Moon. The next day is the day of his school field trip to Vision Enterprises to watch a test launch of the Vision 1 spacecraft. However, since no pets are allowed to go, he has to leave Buddha at home. Buddha meets up with his siblings; Rosebud, Budderball, B-Dawg, and Mudbud, and invites them to come with him to go to see the test launch. They decide to hide in the school bus which soon arrives at the Vision Enterprises, and the dogs go to a space suit machine and put on space suits before following the students, who are being led by Dr. Finkel. The dogs get aboard the Space Shuttle Vision 1. At Mission Control in the Vision Enterprises, Pi confirms they are ready for launch. Meanwhile, the dogs take a close look around until they are sealed in the shuttle, which prepares for launch. Astro, who will be piloting the shuttle from Earth, launches the shuttle, and it flies to space.

At Mission Control, the humans realize the third tank of gas in the shuttle was never filled. With ten hours until the gas runs out, they look for solutions. They eventually decide to pilot the spacecraft to the old R.R.S.S. (Russian Research Space Station). They contact the cosmonaut living in the space station, named Yuri, telling him to refuel the Vision 1. As Vision 1 connects to the space station, the dogs decide to explore the space station, and they meet a dog called Sputnik  who is under the care of Yuri. Sputnik explains that Yuri is quite content to stay in space, yet he wishes to go home. Yuri finds the dogs and becomes happy because the buddies can keep them company, so he traps the buddies in the kitchen, and they are saved later by Sputnik. After Yuri connects the fuel hose to the Vision 1, the fuel starts to leak from the hose. Meanwhile, the buddies and Sputnik rush back to Vision 1 to escape. Yuri activates lock-down to trap the dogs, but they manage to get to the Vision 1. Yuri tries to stop them, banging on the control switches, but sparks drop on the fuel, causing an explosion. The dogs escape from the R.R.S.S. as it explodes. Yuri barely escapes using the Cosmopod escape vessel.

Vision 1 travels to the Moon. Soon after, the Vision 1 approaches and lands on the Moon (Before this event had occurred, B-Dawg had mistaken the Moon for the "Death Star"). They soon begin to get out of the Vision 1 and walk around the area within the place they had landed. Mission Control finds that the sounds from their helmets happen to be soft barks, and conclude they are golden retriever puppies, and this is broadcast on the news. The children find out through the news ("We're live at Vision Enterprises, where quite a furry tale is unfolding. It seems five golden retriever puppies have been accidentally launched into space".). The dogs, while on the Moon, meet a ferret named Gravity who is their mission control assistant. But since their only communication is from audio, they don't know she's a ferret. She orders them to get back on the Vision 1.

When returning to Earth, the path is changed by an unworthy Dr. Finkel. The path's telemetry is reverted into a meteor shower. The "auto-avoidance system" takes control of the Vision 1, rotating and shifting heavily between every meteor in its path, but the Vision 1'''s data communications antenna is busted when it becomes struck by a meteor. Budderball is sent to repair the antenna by doing a space walk outside of the Vision 1. At Mission Control, the adults are puzzled about the change of the telemetry course of the Vision 1 when Sam accuses Dr. Finkel of changing the path. As Dr. Finkel's denies it, Pi uses the security camera to confirm that Dr. Finkel was indeed at the desk at 7:49 pm, the time when the telemetry course was changed. As Dr. Finkel is taken away by security, Sam approaches Dr. Finkel and calls him "Dr. Stinkel".

The Mission Control center receives Yuri's distress signal in the Cosmopod before the Vision 1 enters the atmosphere through the blackout zone. They wait 4 minutes until they arrive, but they arrive early. Vision 1'' ends its mission by slowing down on the take-off strip. The dogs find out Gravity is a ferret. Yuri crashes his pod, and is rescued by some soldiers, telling them he comes from space.

Pi awards the dogs wings of true heroism, with their title as "Space Buddies". Once at home, Buddha gives Sam a Moon rock he had taken from his journey, fulfilling his wish of touching the Moon. The film ends with Sputnik back at home with his old owner, Sasha, saying, "It is the journey and friendship that matters the most".

Cast
Bill Fagerbakke as Pi
Diedrich Bader as Yuri
Kevin Weisman as Dr. Finkel
Lochlyn Munro as Slats Bentley
Ali Hillis as Astro Spalding
Pat Finn as Bill Wolfson
Nolan Gould as Sam
Wayne Wilderson as Tad Thompson
C. Ernst Harth as Guard at the gate to HQ
John Czech as Brazil
Reese Schoeppe as Sasha
Nico Ghisi as Bartleby
Quinn Lord as Pete
Gig Morton as Billy
Sophia Ludwig as Alice
Michael Teigan as Deputy Dan

Voice cast
Skyler Gisondo as B-Dawg
Field Cate as Buddha
Liliana Mumy as Rosebud
Henry Hodges as Mudbud
Josh Flitter as Budderball
Amy Sedaris as Gravity, a black-footed ferret
Jason Earles as Sputnik, a Bull Terrier

Home media
The film was released on DVD and Blu-ray February 3, 2009.

References

External links
 
 

2009 direct-to-video films
2010s science fiction comedy films
American direct-to-video films
2000s English-language films
American children's comedy films
American science fiction comedy films
Animals in space
Disney direct-to-video films
Films about dogs
American sequel films
Direct-to-video sequel films
Fictional dogs
Walt Disney Pictures films
Films directed by Robert Vince
Air Bud (series)
American space adventure films
Films shot in Vancouver
Canadian direct-to-video films
Canadian sequel films
Canadian children's comedy films
Moon in film
2009 films
2000s American films
2000s Canadian films